Jack Tar is a 1915 British silent war film directed by Bert Haldane and starring Jack Tessier, Eve Balfour and Thomas H. MacDonald. An Admiral's daughter goes undercover in Turkey to help a British agent thwart a German plot during the First World War.

Cast
 Jack Tessier as Lt. Jack Atherley  
 Eve Balfour as Margherita 
 Thomas H. MacDonald as Max Schultz 
 Harry Royston as Dick Starling  
 J. Hastings Batson as Sir Michael Westwood 
 Blanche Forsythe as Maid

References

Bibliography
 Goble, Alan. The Complete Index to Literary Sources in Film. Walter de Gruyter, 1999.

External links

1915 films
1910s spy films
1910s war films
British silent feature films
British spy films
British war films
Films set in Turkey
Films directed by Bert Haldane
British black-and-white films
1910s English-language films
1910s British films